Mike the Headless Chicken (April 20, 1945March 17, 1947) was a male Wyandotte  chicken that lived for 18 months after his head had been cut off. After the loss of his head, Mike achieved national fame until his death in March 1947. In Fruita, Colorado, an annual "Mike the Headless Chicken Day" is held every May.

Beheading
On September 10, 1945, farmer Lloyd Olsen of Fruita, Colorado, was planning to eat supper with his mother-in-law and was sent out to the yard by his wife to bring back a chicken. Olsen chose a five-and-a-half-month-old Wyandotte chicken named Mike. The axe removed the bulk of the head, but missed the jugular vein, leaving one ear and most of the brain stem intact.

Despite Olsen's attempt to behead Mike, the chicken was still able to balance on a perch and walk clumsily. He attempted to preen, peck for food, and crow, though with limited success; his "crowing" consisted of a gurgling sound made in his throat. When Mike did not die, Olsen instead decided to care for the bird. He fed it a mixture of milk and water via an eyedropper, and gave it small grains of corn and worms.

Fame
Once his fame had been established, Mike began a career of touring sideshows in the company of such other anomalies as a two-headed baby. He was also photographed for dozens of magazines and papers, and was featured in Time and Life magazines. Mike was put on display to the public for an admission cost of 25 cents. At the height of his popularity, the chicken's owner earned $4,500 per month; Mike was valued at $10,000.

Death
In March 1947, at a motel in Phoenix, Arizona on a stopover while traveling back from tour, Mike started choking in the middle of the night. He had managed to get a kernel of corn in his throat. The Olsens had inadvertently left their feeding and cleaning syringes at the sideshow the day before, and so were unable to save Mike. Olsen claimed that he had sold the bird off, resulting in stories of Mike still touring the country as late as 1949. Other sources say that the chicken's severed trachea could not properly take in enough air to be able to breathe, and he therefore choked to death in the motel.

Explanation of the case
It was determined  that the axe had missed the jugular vein and a clot had prevented Mike from bleeding to death. Although most of his head was severed, most of his brain stem and one ear were left on his body. Since basic functions (breathing, heart rate, etc.) as well as most of a chicken's reflex actions are controlled by the brain stem, Mike was able to remain quite healthy. This is a good example of central motor generators enabling basic homeostatic functions to be carried out in the absence of higher brain centres. In addition, birds possess a secondary balance organ in the pelvic region, the lumbosacral organ, which controls walking locomotion virtually independently from the vestibular organ involved in flight. This has been used to explain how a headless chicken can walk and balance, despite the destruction of much of the cranial vestibular system.

Legacy
Mike the Headless Chicken is now a cultural institution in Fruita, Colorado, with an annual "Mike the Headless Chicken Day", the third weekend of May, starting in 1999. Events held include the "5K Run Like a Headless Chicken Race", egg toss, "Pin the Head on the Chicken", the "Chicken Cluck-Off", and "Chicken Bingo", in which chicken droppings on a numbered grid choose the numbers.

Mike the Headless Chicken was an inspiration for the poultry-themed comedy punk band The Radioactive Chicken Heads, serving as the subject of their 2008 song "Headless Mike", for which a music video was filmed. The band also features a Headless Mike puppet which is frequently used in their live shows.

See also
 List of individual birds

References

Bibliography

External links
 Mike the Headless Chicken.org at City of Fruita
 Is It Possible for a Chicken to Live with Its Head Cut Off? at The Straight Dope
 Mike the Headless Chicken at Life magazine

1945 animal births
1947 animal deaths
Individual chickens
Forteana
Mesa County, Colorado
Individual animals in the United States
Decapitation